Taft, officially the Municipality of Taft, is a 4th class municipality in the province of Eastern Samar, Philippines. According to the 2020 census, it has a population of 18,786 people.

It is bounded on the north by the town of Can-avid and on the south-southeast by the town of Sulat.

The municipality was named in honor of former United States President William Howard Taft, who served as Governor-General of the Philippines during the first decade of the 20th century.

History
Taft is one of the ancient pueblos in Samar situated in the eastern coast which was called Tubabao or Tubabaw in early times. This town was originally named after the river called Malinaw, but since the river causes heavy floods during rainy season, people began calling the place Tubig, which means water in Waray-Waray.

Geography

Barangays
Taft is politically subdivided into 24 barangays.

Climate

Demographics

Economy

Notable personalities

Andres Pagaran - poet and songwriter

References

External links

 [ Philippine Standard Geographic Code]
Philippine Census Information
Local Governance Performance Management System

Municipalities of Eastern Samar